Atlantis is a 1930 drama film directed by Ewald André Dupont and Jean Kemm and starring Maxime Desjardins, Alice Field and Constant Rémy. The film was made as French version of the British film Atlantic, produced by British International Pictures at Elstree Studios. Such Multiple-language versions were common in the early years of sound before dubbing became a more established practice. Like the original version it is based on the 1929 West End play The Berg by Ernest Raymond.

Synopsis
A prestigious luxury liner, the Atlantis, strikes an iceberg and sinks during its maiden voyage across the Atlantic Ocean. The various passengers are forced to come to a reckoning with their impending fate.

Cast
 Maxime Desjardins as Janvry
 Alice Field as 	Madame Lambert
 Constant Rémy as Lambert
 Marcel Vibert as 	Goulven	
 Jeanne Kervich as Madame Janvry
 Hélène Darly	as 	Renée Janvry
 Harry Krimer	as 	Monsieur de Trémont
 Paul Escoffier as Le commandant
 Gaston Dupray	as 	Vilbert
 Léon Belières	as 	Clarel
 André Burgère	as  René Janvry
 René Montis as Un officier

References

Bibliography
 Goble, Alan. The Complete Index to Literary Sources in Film. Walter de Gruyter, 1999.
 Murphy, Robert. Directors in British and Irish Cinema: A Reference Companion. Bloomsbury Publishing, 2019.
 St. Pierre, Paul Matthew. E.A. Dupont and his Contribution to British Film: Varieté, Moulin Rouge, Piccadilly, Atlantic, Two Worlds, Cape Forlorn. Fairleigh Dickinson University Press, 2010

External links

1930 films
British drama films
1930 drama films
1930s French-language films
Films shot at British International Pictures Studios
Films directed by E. A. Dupont
Films directed by Jean Kemm
Seafaring films
British films based on plays
British black-and-white films
British multilingual films
1930 multilingual films
1930s British films